Justus Ferdinand Poggenburg III (January 23, 1895 – December 1966) was an American billiards champion.

Biography
He was born January 23, 1895, to Justus Ferdinand Poggenburg II. He died in December 1966.

References

American pool players
1895 births
1966 deaths